The 1909 Iowa State Cyclones football team represented Iowa State College of Agricultural and Mechanic Arts (later renamed Iowa State University) in the Missouri Valley Conference during the 1909 college football season. In their third season under head coach Clyde Williams, the Cyclones compiled a 4–4 record (2–2 against conference opponents), tied for fifth place in the conference, and outscored their opponents by a combined total of 82 to 62. W.H. Willmarth was the team captain.

Between 1892 and 1913, the football team played on a field that later became the site of the university's Parks Library. The field was known as State Field; when the new field opened in 1914, it became known as "New State Field".

Schedule

References

Iowa State
Iowa State Cyclones football seasons
Iowa State Cyclones football